Epidermoptidae is a family of acariform mites. They live as parasites on the skin of birds and mammals. They thrive in warm, damp areas of the skin (several species are nostril specialists).

References
Epidermoptidae at BioLib

Sarcoptiformes
Acari families